The Shadow of Fu Manchu is an adventure radio drama adapted from the first nine Fu Manchu novels by Sax Rohmer. The syndicated series aired from 1939 to 1940 in 15-minute installments.

Characters and story
Fu Manchu (Harold Huber) was a diabolical criminal mastermind. British official Nayland Smith (Hanley Stafford), assisted by Dr. Petrie (Gale Gordon), set out to stop Fu Manchu at any cost. In Radio Crime Fighters (2002), Jim Cox wrote:  
The plots of Rohmer's insidious figure and Smith and Petrie's attempts to thwart the archenemy formed a repetitive theme in the story line. A stunningly exotic Karamaneh became the slave girl of the evil doctor; an objective of the combatants was to secure her release. The series, though brief, is memorable, and focused on one of the most effective villains to surface in adolescent radio.

References

External links
"In the Shadow Fu Manchu" by Martin Grams, Jr., originally published in Scarlet Street
Jerry Haendiges Vintage Radio Logs: The Shadow of Fu Manchu

1930s American radio programs
1939 radio dramas 
1940s American radio programs
American radio dramas
Fu Manchu